Sankara is a 2007 Sinhalese language drama film directed by Prasanna Jayakody and co-produced by Renuka Balasooriya and Somaratne Dissanayake for Cine Films. It stars Thumindu Dodantenna and Sachini Ayendra in lead roles along with Nilupa Heenkendaarachchi and K.A Milton Perera. Music composed by Nadeeka Guruge.

The film screened in many international festivals such as Asia Pacific Screen Awards, London Film Festival and won many awards. The film received mostly positive reviews. It is the 1082nd Sri Lankan film in the Sinhala cinema. The film was selected for the final round at Cairo International Film Festival and received rave reviews selecting it for the final round of the festival in 2006.

Plot
Young Buddhist monk Ananda, arrives at a temple in order to restore its paintings. These paintings depict Thelapaththa Jathakaya, a moral story where Lord Buddha said that a man with a big target in life must not be swayed by passion (Keles), the five senses and especially beautiful women. One day, Ananda picks up a hair pin belonging to a young woman. While attempting to return this object to its owner, his repressed feelings are awoken by the beauty and sensuality of the woman. The young monk's inner spiritual world is plunged into turmoil. Then one day the paintings are destroyed. While restoring them for the second time Ananda begins to realize that he is trapped in a web of his worldly desires and attachments and highlights the inner struggle of a young Buddhist monk who finds himself attracted to a pretty village girl.

Cast
 Thumindu Dodantenna as Young Monk
 Sachini Ayendra as Village Girl
 K. A. Milton Perera as Old Monk
 Nilupa Heenkendaarachchi as Unnamed Person
 Nethalie Nanayakkara
 Nirdha Uyanhewa
 Sakunathala Peiris

Awards
The Special Jury Prize The Silver Pyramid – Cairo International Film Festival 2006 
Best Debut Director – International Film Festival of Kerala 2006
Netpac Award – International Film Festival of Kerala 2006
Final five at Asia Pacific Screen Awards - Palitha Perera 2007 
SIGNIS Award for Creative Direction - Prasanna Jayakody
SIGNIS Award for Creative Art Director - Sunil Wijeratne
SIGNIS Award for Creative Music Director - Nadeeka Guruge
SIGNIS Award for Creative Editing - Ravindra Guruge
SIGNIS Gold Award for Creative Cinematography - Palitha Perera

References

External links

2006 films
2006 drama films
Films about Buddhism
2000s Sinhala-language films
2006 directorial debut films
Sri Lankan drama films